In mathematics, the Pythagoras number or reduced height of a field describes the structure of the set of squares in the field.  The Pythagoras number p(K) of a field K is the smallest positive integer p such that every sum of squares in K is a sum of p squares.

A Pythagorean field is a field with Pythagoras number 1: that is, every sum of squares is already a square.

Examples
 Every non-negative real number is a square, so p(R) = 1.
 For a finite field of odd characteristic, not every element is a square, but all are the sum of two squares, so p = 2.
 By Lagrange's four-square theorem, every positive rational number is a sum of four squares, and not all are sums of three squares, so p(Q) = 4.

Properties
 Every positive integer occurs as the Pythagoras number of some formally real field.
 The Pythagoras number is related to the Stufe by  p(F) ≤  s(F) + 1.  If F is not formally real then s(F) ≤ p(F) ≤  s(F) + 1, and both cases are possible: for F = C we have s = p = 1, whereas for F = F5 we have s = 1, p = 2.
 The Pythagoras number is related to the height of a field F: if F is formally real then h(F) is the smallest power of 2 which is not less than p(F); if F is not formally real then h(F) = 2s(F).  As a consequence, the Pythagoras number of a non-formally-real field, if finite, is either a power of 2 or 1 less than a power of 2, and all cases occur.

Notes

References
 
 

Field (mathematics)
Sumsets